Sportsklubben Herd is a sports club from Ålesund, Norway. It has sections for association football, handball and swimming, and was founded on 22 August 1932. The men's football team plays in the Third Division (fourth tier) having been relegated from Second Division in 2011.

History
Herd was promoted from the Fourth to the Third Division following the 2008 season. Ahead of the 2009 season they signed Lasse Olsen and Karl Oskar Fjørtoft for both playing and non-playing capacities. In 2010 it contested a playoff to win promotion, and succeeded by beating Sunndal 8–2 on aggregate. In their first season in Second Division, they finished last with 17 points in 24 matches and was relegated.

Recent history 
{|class="wikitable"
|-bgcolor="#efefef"
! Season
! 
! Pos.
! Pl.
! W
! D
! L
! GS
! GA
! P
!Cup
!Notes
|-
|2010 
|3. divisjon
|align=right bgcolor=#DDFFDD| 1
|align=right|22||align=right|19||align=right|0||align=right|3
|align=right|92||align=right|22||align=right|57
||First qualifying round
|Promoted to the 2. divisjon
|-
|2011
|2. divisjon
|align=right bgcolor="#FFCCCC"| 13
|align=right|24||align=right|4||align=right|5||align=right|15
|align=right|32||align=right|66||align=right|17
||First round
|Relegated to the 3. divisjon
|-
|2012
|3. divisjon
|align=right|4
|align=right|26||align=right|15||align=right|2||align=right|9
|align=right|76||align=right|39||align=right|47
||First round
|
|-
|2013 
|3. divisjon
|align=right bgcolor=#DDFFDD| 1
|align=right|26||align=right|21||align=right|2||align=right|3
|align=right|86||align=right|30||align=right|65
||First round
|Promoted to the 2. divisjon
|-
|2014
|2. divisjon
|align=right bgcolor="#FFCCCC"| 12
|align=right|26||align=right|6||align=right|4||align=right|16
|align=right|28||align=right|56||align=right|22
||First round
|Relegated to the 3. divisjon
|}

References

External links
 http://kxweb.no/portal/theme/organization/main.do?theme=MUSTANG&siteId=73

Association football clubs established in 1932
Football clubs in Norway
Sport in Ålesund
1932 establishments in Norway
Defunct athletics clubs in Norway